Choćmirowo is a non-operational PKP railway station in Choćmirowo (Pomeranian Voivodeship), Poland.

Lines crossing the station

References 
Choćmirowo article at Polish Stations Database, URL accessed at 21 March 2006

Railway stations in Pomeranian Voivodeship
Disused railway stations in Pomeranian Voivodeship
Słupsk County